The sad flycatcher (Myiarchus barbirostris) is a species of bird in the family Tyrannidae.
It is endemic to Jamaica.
Its natural habitats are subtropical or tropical moist lowland forests, subtropical or tropical moist montane forests, and heavily degraded former forest.

References

 Raffaele, Herbert; James Wiley, Orlando Garrido, Allan Keith & Janis Raffaele (2003) Birds of the West Indies, Christopher Helm, London.

sad flycatcher
Endemic birds of Jamaica
sad flycatcher
Taxonomy articles created by Polbot